The Apple electric car project (codenamed "Titan") is an electric car project undergoing research and development by Apple Inc. Apple has yet to openly discuss any of its self-driving research, but around 5,000 employees were reported to be working on the project . In May 2018, Apple reportedly partnered with Volkswagen to produce an autonomous employee shuttle van based on the T6 Transporter commercial vehicle platform. In August 2018, the BBC reported that Apple had 66 road-registered driverless cars, with 111 drivers registered to operate those cars. In 2020, it is believed that Apple is still working on self driving related hardware, software and service as a potential product, instead of actual Apple-branded cars. In December 2020, Reuters reported that Apple was planning on a possible launch date of 2024, but analyst Ming-Chi Kuo claimed it would not be launched before 2025 and might not be launched until 2028 or later.

History

2014–2015 
The project was rumored to be approved by Apple CEO Tim Cook in late 2014 and assigned to Vice President Steve Zadesky, a former Ford engineer as project in-charge. For the project, Apple was rumored to have hired Johann Jungwirth, the former-president and chief executive of Mercedes-Benz Research and Development North America, as well as at least one transmission engineer.

By February 2015, it was rumored that a substantial number of Apple employees were working on an electric car project, with Apple hiring new employees for the project as well. Reports in February 2015 indicated that the company had been offering incentives to Tesla employees to join Apple.  In February 2015, The Wall Street Journal reported that the product would resemble more of a minivan than a car, and The Sydney Morning Herald said at that time that production could start as soon as 2020.

In February 2015, Apple board member Mickey Drexler stated that Apple co-founder and CEO Steve Jobs had plans to design and build a car, and that discussions about the concept surfaced around the time that Tesla Motors debuted its first car in 2008. In November 2015, Former Apple iPod Senior VP Tony Fadell confirmed that Steve Jobs was interested in an Apple car back in 2008, shortly after the original iPhone was introduced. In May 2015, Apple investor Carl Icahn stated that he believed rumors that Apple would enter the automobile market in 2020, and that logically Apple would view this car as "the ultimate mobile device".

In August 2015, The Guardian reported that Apple were meeting with officials from GoMentum Station, a testing ground for connected and autonomous vehicles at the former Concord Naval Weapons Station in Concord, California. In September 2015, there were reports that Apple were meeting with self-driving car experts from the California Department of Motor Vehicles. According to The Wall Street Journal in September 2015, it will be a battery electric vehicle, initially lacking full autonomous driving capability, with a possible unveiling around 2019.

In October 2015, Tim Cook stated about the car industry that: "It would seem like there will be massive change in that industry, massive change. You may not agree with that. That's what I think... We'll see what we do in the future. I do think that the industry is at an inflection point for massive change." Cook enumerated ways that the modern descendants of the Ford Model T would be shaken to the very chassis—the growing importance of software in the car of the future, the rise of autonomous vehicles, and the shift from an internal combustion engine to electrification.

In November 2015, various websites reported that suspected Apple front SixtyEight Research had attended an auto body conference in Europe. Also in November 2015, after unknown EV startup Faraday Future announced a $1 billion U.S. factory project, some speculated that it might actually be a front for Apple's secret car project. In late 2015, Apple contracted Torc Robotics to retrofit two Lexus SUVs with sensors in a project known internally as Baja.

2016 
In 2016, Tesla Motors CEO Elon Musk stated that Apple will probably make a compelling electric car: "It's pretty hard to hide something if you hire over a thousand engineers to do it." In May 2016, there were reports indicating Apple was interested in electric car charging stations.

The Wall Street Journal reported on July 25, 2016, that Apple had convinced retired senior hardware engineering executive Bob Mansfield to return and take over the Titan project. A few days later, on July 29, Bloomberg Technology reported that Apple had hired Dan Dodge, the founder and former chief executive officer of QNX, BlackBerry Ltd.’s automotive software division.  According to Bloomberg, Dodge's hiring heralded a shift in emphasis at Apple's Project Titan, in which the company will give first priority to creating software for autonomous vehicles. However, the story said that Apple would continue to develop a vehicle of its own. On September 9, The New York Times reported dozens of layoffs in an effort to reboot, presumably from a team still numbering around 1,000.

The following week, reports surfaced that Magna International, a contract vehicle manufacturer, had a small team working at Apple's Sunnyvale lab.

2017 
After a period of no new reports, car project news flared up again in mid-April 2017, as word spread that Apple was permitted to test autonomous vehicles on California roads. In mid-June, Tim Cook in an interview with Bloomberg TV said Apple was "focusing on autonomous systems" but not necessarily leading to an actual Apple car product, leaving speculation about Apple's role in the convergence of three disruptive "vectors of change": autonomous systems, electric vehicles and ride-sharing services.

In mid-August, various sources reported that the car project was focusing on autonomous systems, now expected to test its technology in the real world using a company-operated inter-campus shuttle service between the main Infinite Loop campus in Cupertino and various Silicon Valley offices, including the new Apple Park. Then at the end of August, around 17 former Titan team members, braking and suspension engineers with Detroit experience, were hired by autonomous vehicle startup Zoox.

October 2016 reports claimed the Titan project has a 2017 deadline to determine its fate - prove its practicality and viability, set a final direction.

In November 2017, Apple employees Yin Zhou and Oncel Tuzel published a paper on VoxelNet, which uses a convolutional neural network to detect three dimensional objects using lidar.

Transportation/tech website Jalopnik reported in late November that Apple was recruiting automotive test engineering and tech talent for autonomous systems work, and appeared to be surreptitiously leasing, via third parties, a former Fiat Chrysler proving grounds site in Surprise, Arizona (originally Wittman).  Also in 2017, The New York Times suggested that Apple had stopped developing its own self-driving car. In response to such reports, Apple CEO Tim Cook acknowledged publicly that year that the company was working on autonomous-car technology.

2018 
In January 2018, the company registered 27 self-driving vehicles with California's Department of Motor Vehicles.

In May 2018, an article in The New York Times reported on major project news. After proposed partnership arrangements with Germany's high-end brands BMW and Mercedes-Benz failed, as did potential alliances with Nissan, BYD Auto, McLaren Automotive, and others, Apple reportedly partnered with Volkswagen to produce an autonomous employee shuttle van based on the T6 Transporter commercial vehicle platform. The T6 Transports would be transformed into autonomous electric versions at VW's Italdesign subsidiary in Turin, Italy, with the frame, wheels, and chassis remaining the same.

While Apple does its best to keep its autonomous vehicles plans secret, regulatory filings do provide some factual insight into its activities. In September 2018, Apple was reportedly in third place in the number of California autonomous vehicle permits with 70, behind GM's Cruise (175) and Alphabet's Waymo (88).

On July 7, 2018, a former Apple employee was arrested by the FBI for allegedly stealing trade secrets about Apple's self-driving car project. He was charged by federal prosecutors. The criminal complaint against the former employee revealed that at that time, Apple still had yet to openly discuss any of its self-driving research, with around 5,000 employees disclosed on the project.

In August 2018, Doug Field, formerly senior vice president of engineering at Tesla, became the leader of Apple's Titan team.

On August 24, 2018, it was reported that one of Apple's self-driving car had apparently been involved in a crash, when it was rear-ended during road-testing. The crash occurred while the car was at a stop, waiting to merge into traffic about 3.5 miles from Apple's headquarters in Cupertino, with no reported injuries. At the time, the BBC reported that Apple had 66 road-registered driverless cars, with 111 drivers registered to operate those cars.

In August 2018, there were reports about an Apple patent of a system that warns riders ahead of time about what an autonomous car would do, purportedly to alleviate the discomfort of surprise.

2019 
In January 2019, Apple laid off more than 200 employees from their 'Project Titan' autonomous vehicle team.

In June 2019, Apple acquired autonomous vehicle startup Drive.ai.

2020 
In early December, Bloomberg reported that Apple artificial intelligence lead John Giannandrea is overseeing Apple Car development as prior lead Bob Mansfield has retired. A few weeks later, Reuters reported that Apple was working towards a possible launch date of 2024 according to two unnamed insiders.

2021 
On January 8, the Korea Economic Daily reported that Hyundai were in early discussions with Apple to jointly develop and produce self-driving electric cars. On January 12, The Verge Reported Apple held talks with EV startup Canoo in 2020. The two companies discussed options ranging from investment to an acquisition. Some weeks later, in late January, Apple announced some upper-level engineering changes, leading some Apple-watchers to speculate if Dan Riccio's "new chapter at Apple" might indicate leadership of the Titan project (or something altogether unrelated, such as augmented/virtual reality headset or deluxe noise-cancelling headphones). By early February, it appeared that Apple was close to a $3.59B deal with Hyundai to use its Kia Motors' West Point, Georgia manufacturing plant for the car, a fully autonomous machine without a driver's seat. However, in February 2021, Hyundai and Kia confirmed that they were not in talks with Apple to develop a car. Adding further credence to Apple's automotive aspirations, Business Insider Deutschland (Germany) reported that Apple had hired Porsche VP of Chassis Development, Dr. Manfred Harrer. After rumors coming from Financial Times about Apple talking to several Japanese car companies about the Apple Car project after the Hyundai-Kia rumor, Nissan came out to Reuters as saying it is not in any of these discussions. The next Apple Car speculation was that Apple was shopping around for Lidar navigation sensor suppliers for its project.

An industry source told The Korea Times that Apple was working in Korea to build up its supply chain.  Later in 2021, Apple was reportedly in talks with Toyota as well as Korean partners for production to commence in 2024.

Alleged employees and affiliates 
 Jamie Carlson, a former engineer on Tesla's Autopilot self-driving car program. After he left Tesla for Apple, he left Apple to work with Chinese automaker Nio on their NIO Pilot autonomous driving platform. Most recently he has returned to Apple special projects.
 Megan McClain, a former Volkswagen AG engineer with expertise in automated driving.
 Vinay Palakkode, a graduate researcher at Carnegie Mellon University, a hub of automated driving research.
 Xianqiao Tong, an engineer who developed computer vision software for driver assistance systems at microchip maker Nvidia Corp NVDA.O.
 Paul Furgale, former deputy director of the Autonomous Systems Lab at the Swiss Federal Institute of Technology in Zurich.
 Sanjai Massey, an engineer with experience in developing connected and automated vehicles at Ford and several suppliers.
 Stefan Weber, a former Bosch engineer with experience in video-based driver assistance systems.
 Lech Szumilas, a former Delphi research scientist with expertise in computer vision and object detection.
 Anup Vader, formerly Caterpillar autonomous systems thermal engineer, who left Apple in April 2019 to join Zoox autonomous vehicle startup.
 Doug Betts, former global quality leader at Fiat Chrysler.
 Johann Jungwirth, former CEO of Mercedes-Benz Research & Development, North America, Inc. – left for VW in Nov. 2015.
 Mujeeb Ijaz, a former Ford Motor Co. engineer, who founded A123 Systems's Venture Technologies division, which focused on materials research, electrical battery cell product development and advanced concepts (who helped recruited four to five staff researchers from A123, a battery technology company)
 Nancy Sun, formerly vice president of electrical engineering at electric motorcycle company Mission Motors in San Francisco.
 Mark Sherwood, formerly director of powertrain systems engineering at Mission Motors.
 Eyal Cohen, formerly vice president of software and electrical engineering at Mission Motors.
 Jonathan Cohen, former director of Nvidia's deep learning software. Nvidia uses deep learning in its Nvidia Drive PX platform, which is used in driver assistance systems.
 Chris Porritt – former Tesla vice president of vehicle engineering and former Aston Martin chief engineer.
 Luigi Taraborrelli, a former Lamborghini executive for 20 years.
 Alex Hitzinger is a German engineer who until March 31, 2016, was the technical director of Porsche's LMP1 project. He previously worked as Head of Advanced Technologies for the Red Bull and Toro Rosso Formula One teams. In January 2019 he left to head the technical VW commercial vehicles department.
 Benjamin Lyon, sensor expert, manager and founding team member, who reported directly to Doug Field, left Apple for a chief engineer position at "satellite and space startup" Astra in Feb 2021.

See also

References 

Apple Inc. hardware
Proposed vehicles
Electric vehicles